David Francis Zawatson (born April 13, 1966) is a former American football offensive guard in the National Football League.

Life
Zawatson was born in 1966, in Cleveland Ohio.   He attended the University of California at Berkeley.

He played for the Chicago Bears (1989), the New York Jets (1990), the Miami Dolphins (1991), and the Atlanta Falcons (1992).

He is currently the district director for PE, recreation and athletics for the Great Neck Public Schools and the coordinator for the Nassau BOCES PE Consortium.

He is currently married to Panagiota Kanakaki.

References

External links
Profile and statistics at NFL.com

1966 births
Living people
Players of American football from Cleveland
American football offensive guards
American football offensive tackles
California Golden Bears football players
Chicago Bears players
New York Jets players
Miami Dolphins players
Atlanta Falcons players